Jorma Kalevi Härkönen (born 17 May 1956 in Saari) is a retired middle distance runner from Finland. He is best known for winning the bronze medal at the 1982 European Championships in Athens, Greece.

References
1982 Year Ranking

1956 births
Living people
People from Parikkala
Finnish male middle-distance runners
European Athletics Championships medalists
Sportspeople from South Karelia